Daniel 'Dani' Espejo Guillén (born 23 July 1993) is a Spanish footballer who plays for Algeciras CF. Mainly a left back, he can also play as a left winger.

Club career
Born in Córdoba, Andalusia, Espejo finished his formation with local Córdoba CF, making his senior debuts with the reserves in 2011. On 29 September 2013 he played his first official game with the first team, starting in a 2–0 home win over Girona FC in the Segunda División championship.

On 21 July 2014, Espejo joined another reserve team, Atlético Madrid B. He left the side in 2016, and subsequently represented Tercera División sides CF Sant Rafel, CD Ciudad de Lucena and Linares Deportivo.

References

External links

1993 births
Living people
Footballers from Córdoba, Spain
Spanish footballers
Association football defenders
Association football wingers
Segunda División players
Segunda División B players
Tercera División players
Córdoba CF B players
Córdoba CF players
Atlético Madrid B players
CD Ciudad de Lucena players
Linares Deportivo footballers
Algeciras CF footballers